People's Front of Iceland (PFI) is an anti-capitalist political party in Iceland founded on 18 February 2013, seeking to "... free the people from the yoke of market capitalism". It is "unconditionally opposed" to Iceland's accession to both the European Union and NATO, believing them to be "imperialist" organisations. The party founder, Þorvaldur Þorvaldsson (tl. Thorvaldur), is a self-declared communist.

History

The People's Front of Iceland originated in Reykjavík. Party founder Þorvaldur Þorvaldsson organised poetry readings and other informal meetings which were attended by workers, radicalised in the aftermath of the 2008 Icelandic financial crisis.

They successfully applied for the list letter R to contest the 2013 Icelandic parliamentary election, marking their first foray into electoral politics, and subsequently submitted an official candidate list on 12 April 2013. In the 2013 election they chose to only run candidates in the Reykjavík North and Reykjavík South constituencies.

In the spring of 2014, they ran in the Reykjavik city council elections and got 219 votes but did not get a seat on the council.

In the autumn of 2016, they ran for Althing elections again, in five constituencies (out of six) and got 575 votes, or 0.3%.

Electoral results

References

External links
 Official website

Anti-capitalist organizations
Environmentalism in Iceland
Eurosceptic parties in Iceland
Pacifism in Europe
Pacifist parties
Political parties established in 2013
Socialist parties in Iceland